The 2018 New Zealand Sevens was the fourth tournament within the 2017–18 World Rugby Sevens Series and the nineteenth edition of the New Zealand Sevens, and the first to be held in Hamilton. It was held over the weekend of 3–4 February 2017 at FMG Stadium Waikato.

Format
The teams were drawn into four pools of four teams each, with each team playing every other team in their pool once. The top two teams from each pool advanced to the Cup/5th place brackets. The bottom two teams from each group went to the Challenge trophy/13th place brackets.

Teams
Fifteen core teams are participating in the tournament along with one invited team, the highest-placing non-core team of the 2017 Oceania Sevens Championship, Papua New Guinea:

Pool stage
All times in New Zealand Daylight Time (UTC+13:00)

Pool A

Pool B

Pool C

Pool D

Knockout stage

13th Place

Challenge Trophy

5th Place

Cup

Tournament placings

Source: World Rugby

Players

Scoring leaders

Source: World Rugby

Dream Team
The following seven players were selected to the tournament Dream Team at the conclusion of the tournament:

References

External links
 Tournament Page

2018
2017–18 World Rugby Sevens Series
2018 in New Zealand rugby union
February 2018 sports events in New Zealand